Carex dissita, also known as purei, is a sedge that is native to New Zealand.

Carex dissita thrives in dark and damp places such as the edges of bush streams or ponds. Seeds occur on long stems in order to disperse them away from the plant.

References

dissita
Flora of New Zealand
Plants described in 1853
Taxa named by Joseph Dalton Hooker